Prevost, Prévost or Prévôt may refer to:

Places
 Prévost (electoral district), Quebec, a provincial electoral district
 Prévost, Quebec, a community in the Laurentians region of Quebec, Canada
 Prévost station
 Prevost, a community on Stuart Island, San Juan County, Washington, USA

Ships
HMCS Prevost, a Canadian naval reserve unit in London, Ontario
, a 12-gun schooner that the Royal Navy purchased in 1803 and that the French privateer Austerlitz captured in 1807
HMS Sir George Prevost, a British naval warship
USS Lady Prevost (1812), a United States warship

Other uses
Prevost Car, a bus manufacturer and division of Volvo Buses
Prévost reaction, a chemical reaction
Prevost's ground sparrow, a sparrow
Prevost's squirrel, a rodent

People with the surname
Abbé Prévost (1697–1763), French novelist
André Prévost (composer) (1934–2001), Canadian composer
Augustine Prévost (1723–1786), British general
Charles Prévost (1899–1983), French chemist
Codie Prevost (born 1984), Canadian country singer
Constant Prévost (1787–1856), French geologist
Daniel Prévost (born 1939), writer
Daniel Prévost (born 1939), French actor
Eddie Prévost (born 1942), English drummer and percussionist
Eugène Prévost (carpenter) (1898–1965), founder of Prevost Car
Eugène Prévost (cyclist) (1863–1861), French cyclist
Eugène Prévost (musician) (1809–1872), French composer and conductor
Florent Prévost (1794–1870), French naturalist
Françoise Prévost (1680–1741), French dancer
Françoise Prévost (actress) (1930–1997), actress
Gédéon-Mélasippe Prévost (1817–1887), Quebec notary and political figure
George Prévost (1767–1816), British general and governor
George Prevost McKay (1840–1924), Canadian business executive and politician
 (1808–1873), inventor of a stenography system; see Théodore-Pierre Bertin
Isaac-Bénédict Prévost (1755–1819), Swiss theologian, plant pathologist and naturalist
James Charles Prevost (1810–1891), British admiral
Jean Prévost (1901–1944), French writer and Resistance fighter
Jean Prévost (politician) (1870–1915), Quebec lawyer, journalist and politician
Jean-Louis Prévost (1838–1927), Swiss neurologist and physiologist
Jean-Louis Prévost (1790–1850), botanical artist
Joël Prévost (born 1950), musician
Louis Prévost de Sansac (1496–1576), a Marshal of France
Lucien-Anatole Prévost-Paradol (1829–1870), French journalist and essayist
Marcel Prévost (1862–1941), French writer
Marie Prevost (1896–1937), actress
Maurice Prévost (1887–1948), French pioneer aviator
Michael Prevost (born 1953), German-Canadian boxer
Nicholas Le Prevost (born 1947), English actor
Pierre Prévost (physicist) (1751–1839), Swiss philosopher and physicist
Pierre André Prévost de La Prévostière, governor general of Pondicherry
Prevost baronets, title in the Baronetage of the United Kingdom
Robert Prévost (1927–1982), Canadian set designer
Victor Prevost (1820–1881), photographer
Wilfrid Prévost (1832–1898), Quebec lawyer and politician
Yves Prévost (1908–1997), Quebec lawyer and politician
Yvonne Prévost (1878–1942), tennis player

See also

Provost (disambiguation)

Surnames of French origin